Leo Connard (born Isak Leopold Kohn; 28 August 1860 – after 1928) was an Austrian stage and film actor. He appeared in more than thirty films from 1916 to 1928.

Selected filmography

References

External links 

1860 births
1931 deaths
Austrian male stage actors
Austrian male film actors
Austrian male silent film actors
Jewish Austrian male actors
20th-century Austrian male actors